William Wildman (born 30 November 1883–) was an English footballer who played as a right-back for Everton and West Ham United.

Club career
Wildman started with Everton making his debut on 28 January 1905 against Middlesbrough. He played only two games for Everton before being signed by manager Syd King for West Ham United in 1906. He missed only one game in his first season with West Ham but in the second game of the following season, against Tottenham Hotspur, he was injured. He had made only forty-one appearances in all competitions before retiring due to his injuries.

References

1883 births
Association football defenders
West Ham United F.C. players
Everton F.C. players
Footballers from Liverpool
Year of death missing
English footballers
English Football League players
Southern Football League players